Antennophoridae is a family of mites in the order Mesostigmata.

Genera
Antennophoridae contains five genera, with nine recognized species. Antennophorus grandis is an ectoparasite on ants of the species Lasius flavus.

 Antennophorus Haller, 1877
 Echinomegistus Berlese, 1903
 Antennomegistus Berlese, 1903
 Celaenosthanus Vitzthum, 1930
 Neomegistus Trägårdh, 1906

References

Mesostigmata
Acari families